Dodge is a surname.

People surnamed Dodge
 A. Clarke Dodge (1834–1916), American politician and businessman
 Adee Dodge (1912–1993), Navajo artist, code-talker, linguist
 Augustus C. Dodge (1812–1883), Congressional delegate from Iowa Territory, U.S. Senator from Iowa
 Bayard Dodge (1888–1972), president of the Syrian Protestant College, renamed American University of Beirut, 1923-1948; son of Cleveland Hoadley Dodge, father of David S. Dodge
 Carroll William Dodge (1895-1988), American mycologist and lichenologist
 Charles Dodge (disambiguation), multiple people
 Cleveland Hoadley Dodge (1860–1926), American businessman and philanthropist, grandson of William E. Dodge
 David A. Dodge, governor of the Bank of Canada 2001-2008
 David S. Dodge (born 1922), academic administrator, long associated with the American University of Beirut
 Frances Dodge (1914–1971), horse breeder
 Geraldine Rockefeller Dodge (1882–1973), philanthropist, art patron, dog breeder; married to Marcellus H. Sr.
 Grenville M. Dodge (1831–1916), an army officer, railroad executive and politician
 Harold F. Dodge (1893–1976)
 Henry Dodge (1782–1867), nineteenth-century politician
 Henry Percival Dodge (1870–1936)
 Horace Elgin Dodge (1868–1920), automobile pioneer and co-founder of Dodge Brothers Motor Vehicle Company
 Joe Dodge (1922–2004), American jazz musician
 John Francis Dodge (1864–1920), automobile pioneer and founders of Dodge Brothers Motor Vehicle Company
 Johnnie Dodge (1894–1960), British army officer
 Joseph Dodge (1890–1964), American economist
 Joshua Eric Dodge (1854–1921), Wisconsin Supreme Court justice
 Marcellus Hartley Dodge Jr. (1908–1930), automobile crash victim, only child of Geraldine R. and Marcellus H. Sr.
 Marcellus Hartley Dodge Sr. (1881–1963), philanthropist, owner of the Remington Arms Company
 Mary Mapes Dodge (1831–1905)
 Mick Dodge, reality TV star
 Raquel Dodge, former General Prosecutor of Brazil
 Richard Irving Dodge (1827–1895), army officer and author
 Sue Dodge, American singer of southern gospel music
 Theodore Ayrault Dodge (1842–1909), American officer, military historian, and businessman
 Thomas Dodge, American bureaucrat
 Toby Dodge (fl. c. 2000), a British academic
 William E. Dodge (1805–1883), one of the "merchant princes of Wall Street" during the nineteenth century
 William E. Dodge Jr. (1832–1903)
 William I. Dodge (c. 1789–1873), New York politician
 Yadolah Dodge (born 1944), an Iranian and Swiss statistician

United States
Most Dodges in the United States descend from either the brothers William and Richard Dodge of Beverly, Essex, Massachusetts and previously Somerset in England, or from the possibly unrelated Tristram Dodge of Rhode Island.

Descendants of William Dodge:

 Horace Elgin Dodge (1868–1920)
 John Francis Dodge (1864–1920)
 Isabel Dodge Sloane (1896–1962)
 Frances Dodge (1914–1971)
 Theodore Ayrault Dodge (1842–1909)

Descendants of Richard Dodge:

 David Low Dodge (1774–1852)
 William E. Dodge Sr. (1805–1883)
 William E. Dodge Jr. (1832–1903)
 Grace Hoadley Dodge (1856–1914)
 William Earl Dodge III (1858–1886)
 Cleveland Hoadley Dodge (1860–1926)
 Bayard Dodge (1888–1972)
 David S. Dodge (1922–2009)
 Cleveland Earl Dodge (1888–1982)
 Cleveland E. Dodge Jr. (1922–2007)
 Mary Melissa Hoadley Dodge (1861–1934)
 Anson Greene Phelps Dodge (1834–1918)
 David Stuart Dodge (1836–1921)
 Charles Cleveland Dodge (1841–1910)
 Charles Stuart Dodge
 Lucie Bigelow Rosen (1890–1968)
 Johnnie Dodge (1894–1960)
 Norman White Dodge (1846–1907)
 Marcellus Hartley Dodge Sr. (1881–1963)
 Marcellus Hartley Dodge Jr. (1908–1930)
 Elizabeth Clementine Dodge Stedman (1810–1889)
 Grenville M. Dodge (1831–1916)
 Bernard Ogilvie Dodge (1872–1960)
 Homer L. Dodge (1887–1983)
 Joshua Eric Dodge (1854–1921)

Descendants of Tristram Dodge:

 Henry Dodge (1782–1867)
 Augustus C. Dodge (1812–1883)
 John Wood Dodge (1807–1893)
 William de Leftwich Dodge (1867–1935)
 William I. Dodge (1789–1873)
 Richard Irving Dodge (1827–1895)

References
 Dodge, Joseph Thompson, Genealogy of the Dodge Family of Essex County, Mass 1629–1894. Madison, Wisconsin. Democrat Printing Company. 1894.
 Woodward, Theron Royal, Dodge Genealogy – The Descendants of Tristram Dodge. Chicago, Illiois. 1904.